Ainthaam Padai is a 2009 Tamil language action film starring Sundar C, Simran, Mukesh, Vivek and Nassar. It released on 23 July 2009 and was produced by Sundar's wife, Khushbu. The film was flop at the box office.

Plot
The film is about relationships between two families where hardships and affections are on the competencies.

As the film moves ahead, it unravels about an enmity with another family where Devasena (Simran) is a pampered daughter. But Gunasekaran (Nassar) is kind enough in breaking the hardships and getting united by arranging nuptials for Devasena with his brother Karunakaran (Mukesh). However, Devasena mistakes Prabhakaran (Sundar C) to be her bridegroom. When things are unraveled and Prabhakaran turns away from Devasena's offer of marrying him, she vows to alienate him from his family by marrying Karunakaran.

Devasena did not live with her husband Karunakaran after her marriage and intends to take revenge on Prabhakaran. When she finds out that Prabhakaran and Gayathri (Aditi Chowdary) are in love, she tries to make their love fail. For that she seeks the help of her uncle Dhanushkodi (Doddanna). Dhanushkodi kidnaps Gayathri's father and tries to force Gayathri to marry his last son. He makes her lie in her heartfelt consent to the engagement. Devasena is very happy to take revenge on Prabhakaran and challenges him.

Memories of the past are coming to Prabhakaran. A few years ago, Gunasekaran and his girlfriend Kalpana (Devayani) were engaged to be married. Meanwhile, Dhanushkodi and Rajadurai (Raj Kapoor) were selling illicit liquor in the town. Kalpana, who was then the women's team leader of the town, went with her group to stop the scam, and a fight broke out between Prabhakaran and Rajadurai. Thus, Dhanushkodi and his sons face great humiliation in the town. They agree to an order to leave the city as soon as possible.

Thus, enmity develops between the Dhanushkodi and Gunasekaran families. In particular, the idea arises for Rajadurai to take revenge on Kalpana somehow. The next day, the wedding arrangements of Gunasekaran and Kalpana take place at the temple as scheduled. Kalpana wears a garland and sits on the wedding stage, where Rajadurai comes in disguise. Kalpana sees that he has come with a thaali in his hand. While Kalpana is confused as to what is going on, Rajadurai tries to forcefully tie the thaali around Kalpana's neck without any delay. Before he finishes tie the knot, Kalpana pushes him away and runs away from him to the temple. Rajadurai beats up some people including Gunasekaran who came to stop him and chases Kalpana away. No matter how far Kalpana ran, Rajadurai caught her at the roadblock. When Kalpana begged Rajadurai not to, he forcibly tied Thaali around her neck. Shocked, Kalpana carries the thaali he has tied with her hands. In the ensuing battle, Rajadurai is killed by Prabhakaran in a defensive attempt. Seeing this, Kalpana is shocked and becomes mentally challenged. Thus, Prabhakaran ends by telling Thanthoni (Vivek) about this past.

The rest of the film is about the hand-in-hand combat between Prabhakaran and Devasena, with each one moving around with their smart plans. Knowing the whole conspiracy behind Prabhakaran, he plans to thwart Devasena's plans with the help of Thanthoni without anyone knowing. Thanthoni disguises himself as a preacher and intimidates a minister (Radha Ravi) into using him as a helper in this plan. Meanwhile, Kalpana, who was locked up in Dhanushkodi's house, regains consciousness due to a disturbance that took place there. Prabhakaran manages to rescue Gayathri's father safely from Dhanushkodi. After causing chaos in the wedding that was to take place there, Prabhakaran, who had somehow stood in front of Devasena, happily tied the thaali around Gayathri's neck with her satisfaction.

Dhanushkodi is angry with Devasena and tries to kill her and turn it into a suicide. Then Kalpana helps her. Gunasekaran, Karunakaran, and Prabhakaran together defeat them. Later that night, the couples - Prabhakaran and Gayathri; Gunasekaran and Kalpana; Karunakaran and Devasena; and Thanthoni and Diana (Aarthi) - start happily celebrating their first night together.

Cast

 Sundar C as Prabhakaran
 Simran as Devasena Karunakaran
 Mukesh as Karunakaran
 Vivek as Thanthoni
 Nassar as Gunasekaran
 Devayani as Kalpana Gunasekaran
 Aditi Choudhary as Gayathri Prabhakaran
 Aarthi as Diana Thanthoni
 Doddanna as Dhanushkodi
 Raj Kapoor as Rajadurai
 Sai Prashanth as Dinakaran
 Madhan Bob as Devasena's father
 Sampath Raj as Periyasamy
 Radha Ravi as Minister
 Aryan as Paneerselvam
 Vichu Vishwanath as Ennasi
 Besant Ravi as Dhanushkodi's henchman
 Minnal Ravi
 Suja in an item number

Soundtrack
The soundtrack was composed by D. Imman, and lyrics were written by Gangai Amaran and Na. Muthukumar.

Reception
Rediff wrote, "Aindham Padai never takes itself seriously. It is not meant to be one. It's got a lot of lewd jokes, double entendre, just plain irritating stunts, and songs guaranteed to titillate the front-benchers, but Simran is one of the reasons it works even halfway." Behindwoods wrote "
The movie necessarily has the wholesome potential of a primetime sitcom and falls short of either powerful performances or an effectual plot." The Hindu wrote "This could’ve been the season’s heart-warming family drama with enough twists and turns to keep you hooked. But 'Aintham Padai' (U), promoted as a mass entertainer, comes across as a mega television serial with too many sub-plots that take their own sweet time to come to a conclusion."

See also
 Tamil films of 2009

References

2009 action drama films
2009 films
2000s Tamil-language films
Indian action drama films
Films directed by Badri